"Waking Up Slow" is a song by English singer-songwriter Gabrielle Aplin. It was released through Aplin's record label Never Fade Records on 9 August 2017, as the lead single from her sixth extended play (EP), Avalon. The song was written by Aplin and Peter Rycroft, and produced by Lostboy. The song was released as a piano version on 1 September 2017.

Music video
The music video for the song was released on 22 September 2017 via YouTube, and was directed by Charlotte Rutherford.

Charts

Release history

References

External links
 
 
 

2017 songs
2017 singles
Gabrielle Aplin songs
Songs written by Gabrielle Aplin